Death Road to Canada is a 2016 roguelike video game developed by Rocketcat Games and Madgarden, and published by Rocketcat Games. The game is a roguelike in which the player tries to get to Canada in order to escape the zombie-infested United States. The game released for Microsoft Windows, OS X, and Linux on July 22, 2016, with later releases for iOS, Android, Nintendo Switch, PlayStation 4, and Xbox One.

Gameplay 
The game starts with two survivors going on a road trip, hoping to escape the zombie apocalypse in America, and escape to Canada. Death Road to Canada takes place over two in-game weeks as the party tries to make it to the border. Each character you meet can join your party (up to four characters), and all of them have varying mood levels, different skills, and backgrounds. Every run, the player stops at locations, trying to find supplies like medkits, weapons, gasoline, and food to survive. The player can use different types of weapons from melee to ranged.

Occasionally, the player will encounter "siege" events, where they need to survive a growing zombie horde for a set amount of time. Death Road has interactive fiction events in between times spent in locations. Through text the player is presented with multiple choices that they benefit from or are harmed by; the decisions are affected by each character's backgrounds and moods.

Development 
The studio's previous game, Wayward Souls, released in 2014, and following that, development on Death Road to Canada began. One of Rocketcat's developers said "The story is a humorous take on how America sees Canada, as thought up by someone that lives in Kitchener". The story was also influenced by the goofiness of the zombie genre, and the possibilities of randomly generated storytelling. It was the studio's first game to launch first on PC, in order to not have to balance making the game profitable for mobile, and making sure it was fun for players, wanting to avoid making it free-to-play. The developer commented "How free-to-play games work is that you're counting on people to get annoyed, and then having to pay to reduce their annoyance". Zombies were intended to be slow, but could do enough damage so that large hordes of them could overwhelm the player. The text interludes were added to provide an opportunity for each of the character's personalities to come out. Rocketcat took inspiration from what Auwae called "the unintentionally funny parts of the Walking Dead", and George Romero. Over the course of development, text events and the action gameplay had equal priority at one point, but over time it shifted to focusing more on the action gameplay.

Reception 

Death Road to Canada received "mixed or average reviews" according to Metacritic.

Destructoid praised the music, calling it "chirpy, contagious, and memorable." The reviewer criticized the randomness that the game could have, "the RNG feels capable of viciously screwing you over from time to time without recourse". Nintendo Life liked the world of Death Road to Canada, writing that the game "allows fans of the zombie genre to live out their ultimate survival fantasies again and again", while disliking the repetitiveness of the game, saying "the patterns and outcomes may become a little too predictable for the average player". Pocket Gamer felt that the gameplay contributed to making the game a "beautifully clammy, scratchy gem".

Neal Ronaghan of Nintendo World Report enjoyed the character creation, "It’s fun making characters, and having the ability to upgrade the different archetypes... means you can have a little bit of an advantage to start the trek." Ronaghan disliked the randomness of Death Road, feeling that it made character decisions pointless, "The brutal, random nature too often made me feel like I had little agency in my quest". TouchArcade liked the survival elements of the game, as the reviewer wrote, "Death Road to Canada nails the struggle of trying to survive".

Notes

References 

2016 video games
Linux games
MacOS games
Mobile games
Multiplayer and single-player video games
Nintendo Switch games
Noodlecake Games games
PlayStation 4 games
Roguelike video games
Video games about zombies
Video games developed in Canada
Video games set in Canada
Xbox One games
Rocketcat Games games